Oliver Griffiths (born 23 March 1995) is a Wales international  rugby union player who plays for the Dragons regional team as a flanker.

Griffiths made his debut for the Newport Gwent Dragons regional team in 2014 having previously played for the Dragons academy, Cross Keys RFC and Newport RFC.

International
In May 2017 Griffiths was selected for the Wales national team summer 2017 tour of Samoa and Tonga.

Griffiths made his test debut off the bench against Tonga on 15 June 2017. He came off the bench in an uncapped match against the Barbarians.

References

External links 
Dragons profile

Rugby union players from Newport, Wales
Welsh rugby union players
Wales international rugby union players
Dragons RFC players
Living people
1995 births
Cross Keys RFC players
Newport RFC players
Rugby union flankers